The Bill Bennett ministry was the combined Cabinet (formally the Executive Council of British Columbia) that governed British Columbia from December 22, 1975, to August 6, 1986. It was led by Bill Bennett, the 27th premier of British Columbia, and consisted of members of the Social Credit Party.

The Bill Bennett ministry was established after the 1975 British Columbia general election when premier Dave Barrett was defeated in the general election and Bill Bennett was elected as his successor. Following the 1979 election and 1983 election, it continued to govern through the 34th Parliament of British Columbia, until Bennett retired as Premier in 1986. It was succeeded by the Vander Zalm ministry.

List of ministers

References

Sources 

Politics of British Columbia
Executive Council of British Columbia
1975 establishments in British Columbia
Cabinets established in 1975
1986 disestablishments in British Columbia
Cabinets disestablished in 1986